The 2006–07 Philadelphia Flyers season was the Flyers' 40th season in the National Hockey League (NHL). For the first time in franchise history the Flyers finished with the worst record in the entire league and missed the playoffs for the first time since 1994.

Off-season
During the off-season the Flyers lost Michal Handzus in a trade with the Chicago Blackhawks, defenseman Kim Johnsson to free agency and Eric Desjardins and team captain Keith Primeau to retirement.

On September 12, 2006, the Flyers signed restricted free agent Ryan Kesler of the Vancouver Canucks to an offer sheet. The Canucks matched the 1-year, $1.9 million deal.

Regular season
Peter Forsberg replaced Primeau as team captain, but a chronic foot injury had him in and out of the lineup throughout the season and limited his effectiveness. Eight games into the regular season and with a record of 1–6–1, general manager Bob Clarke resigned and head coach Ken Hitchcock was fired. Assistant coach John Stevens replaced Hitchcock and assistant general manager Paul Holmgren took on Clarke's responsibilities on an interim basis.

The changes did little to improve the Flyers fortunes in 2006–07 as setting franchise records for futility became the norm. They had several multiple-game losing streaks including a franchise worst 10–game losing streak and a 12–game home losing streak that stretched from November 29 to February 10. Ultimately, the Flyers finished with a 22–48–12 record, the most losses in franchise history and the worst record in the league. They also set the NHL record for the biggest points drop off in the standings in a one-year span (101 points in 2005–06 to 56 points in 2006–07, a difference of 45 points).

With the team clearly on the verge of missing the playoffs for the first time since 1994, Holmgren set his sights on rebuilding the team and preparing for the future. Forsberg, unwilling to commit to playing next season, was traded to the Nashville Predators for Scottie Upshall, Ryan Parent, and 2007 1st and 3rd-round draft picks. Veteran defenseman Alexei Zhitnik was traded to the Atlanta Thrashers for prospect defenseman Braydon Coburn and disappointing off-season acquisition Kyle Calder was sent to the Detroit Red Wings via Chicago in exchange for defenseman Lasse Kukkonen. The Flyers also acquired goaltender Martin Biron from the Buffalo Sabres for a 2007 2nd-round pick. Given wide praise for his efforts, the Flyers gave Holmgren a two-year contract and removed the interim label from his title.

The Flyers finished the regular season having allowed 297 goals (excluding 6 shootout goals allowed), the most in the League.

Season standings

Schedule and results

Preseason

|- style="background:#fcf;"
| 1 || September 20 || @ Pittsburgh Penguins || 4–5 || 0–1–0 ||
|- style="background:#cfc;"
| 2 || September 21 || New Jersey Devils || 2–1 || 1–1–0 ||
|- style="background:#fcf;"
| 3 || September 23 || Ottawa Senators || 3–4 || 1–2–0 ||
|- style="background:#fcf;"
| 4 || September 24 || @ Pittsburgh Penguins || 1–2 || 1–3–0 ||
|- style="background:#fcf;"
| 5 || September 26 || Washington Capitals || 1–6 || 1–4–0 ||
|- style="background:#ffc;"
| 6 || September 28 || @ New Jersey Devils || 4–5 SO || 1–4–1 ||
|- style="background:#fcf;"
| 7 || September 29 || @ Washington Capitals || 0–1 || 1–5–1 ||
|-
| colspan="6" style="text-align:center;"|
Notes:
 Game played at Moncton Coliseum in Moncton, New Brunswick.
 Game played at John Labatt Centre in London, Ontario.
|-

|-
| Legend:

Regular season

|- style="background:#fcf;"
| 1 || October 5 || Philadelphia || 0–4 || Pittsburgh  ||  || Esche || 16,957 || 0–1–0 || 0 || 
|- style="background:#ffc;"
| 2 || October 7 || NY Rangers  || 5–4 || Philadelphia || SO || Niittymaki || 19,798 || 0–1–1 || 1 || 
|- style="background:#cfc;"
| 3 || October 10 || Philadelphia || 4–2 || NY Rangers  ||  || Niittymaki || 18,200 || 1–1–1 || 3 || 
|- style="background:#fcf;"
| 4 || October 11 || Montreal  || 3–1 || Philadelphia ||  || Niittymaki || 19,256 || 1–2–1 || 3 || 
|- style="background:#fcf;"
| 5 || October 14 || Philadelphia || 2–3 || New Jersey  ||  || Niittymaki || 14,177 || 1–3–1 || 3 || 
|- style="background:#fcf;"
| 6 || October 17 || Philadelphia || 1–9 || Buffalo  ||  || Esche || 18,690 || 1–4–1 || 3 || 
|- style="background:#fcf;"
| 7 || October 19 || Philadelphia || 1–4 || Tampa Bay  ||  || Niittymaki || 19,920 || 1–5–1 || 3 || 
|- style="background:#fcf;"
| 8 || October 20 || Philadelphia || 2–3 || Florida  ||  || Niittymaki || 17,194 || 1–6–1 || 3 || 
|- style="background:#cfc;"
| 9 || October 26 || Atlanta  || 2–3 || Philadelphia || SO || Niittymaki || 19,228 || 2–6–1 || 5 || 
|- style="background:#fcf;"
| 10 || October 28 || Pittsburgh  || 8–2 || Philadelphia ||  || Niittymaki || 19,589 || 2–7–1 || 5 || 
|- style="background:#cfc;"
| 11 || October 30 || Chicago  || 0–3 || Philadelphia ||  || Esche || 18,876 || 3–7–1 || 7 || 
|-

|- style="background:#fcf;"
| 12 || November 2 || Tampa Bay  || 5–2 || Philadelphia ||  || Niittymaki || 18,633 || 3–8–1 || 7 || 
|- style="background:#fcf;"
| 13 || November 4 || Washington  || 5–3 || Philadelphia ||  || Esche || 19,564 || 3–9–1 || 7 || 
|- style="background:#fcf;"
| 14 || November 6 || Philadelphia || 1–4 || Toronto  ||  || Niittymaki || 19,501 || 3–10–1 || 7 || 
|- style="background:#fcf;"
| 15 || November 9 || NY Islanders  || 3–1 || Philadelphia ||  || Niittymaki || 18,656 || 3–11–1 || 7 || 
|- style="background:#ffc;"
| 16 || November 11 || Buffalo  || 5–4 || Philadelphia || OT || Niittymaki || 19,633 || 3–11–2 || 8 || 
|- style="background:#fcf;"
| 17 || November 13 || Philadelphia || 2–3 || Pittsburgh  ||  || Niittymaki || 13,781 || 3–12–2 || 8 || 
|- style="background:#cfc;"
| 18 || November 15 || Philadelphia || 7–4 || Anaheim  ||  || Esche || 15,379 || 4–12–2 || 10 || 
|- style="background:#cfc;"
| 19 || November 16 || Philadelphia || 4–3 || Los Angeles  ||  || Niittymaki || 16,446 || 5–12–2 || 12 || 
|- style="background:#fcf;"
| 20 || November 18 || Philadelphia || 1–6 || San Jose  ||  || Esche || 17,496 || 5–13–2 || 12 || 
|- style="background:#fcf;"
| 21 || November 20 || Pittsburgh  || 5–3 || Philadelphia ||  || Niittymaki || 19,349 || 5–14–2 || 12 || 
|- style="background:#ffc;"
| 22 || November 22 || Ottawa  || 3–2 || Philadelphia || OT || Niittymaki || 18,990 || 5–14–3 || 13 || 
|- style="background:#cfc;"
| 23 || November 24 || Columbus  || 2–3 || Philadelphia ||  || Niittymaki || 19,301 || 6–14–3 || 15 || 
|- style="background:#cfc;"
| 24 || November 25 || Philadelphia || 4–2 || Montreal  ||  || Niittymaki || 21,273 || 7–14–3 || 17 || 
|- style="background:#fcf;"
| 25 || November 29 || Nashville  || 3–2 || Philadelphia ||  || Niittymaki || 18,789 || 7–15–3 || 17 || 
|- style="background:#cfc;"
| 26 || November 30 || Philadelphia || 3–2 || NY Islanders  ||  || Niittymaki || 10,280 || 8–15–3 || 19 || 
|-

|- style="background:#ffc;"
| 27 || December 2 || New Jersey  || 4–3 || Philadelphia || SO || Niittymaki || 19,559 || 8–15–4 || 20 || 
|- style="background:#fcf;"
| 28 || December 8 || Philadelphia || 0–2 || New Jersey  ||  || Niittymaki || 14,003 || 8–16–4 || 20 || 
|- style="background:#fcf;"
| 29 || December 9 || Washington  || 5–3 || Philadelphia ||  || Niittymaki || 19,211 || 8–17–4 || 20 || 
|- style="background:#fcf;"
| 30 || December 12 || NY Rangers  || 3–1 || Philadelphia ||  || Niittymaki || 19,389 || 8–18–4 || 20 || 
|- style="background:#fcf;"
| 31 || December 13 || Philadelphia || 4–8 || Pittsburgh  ||  || Niittymaki || 14,150 || 8–19–4 || 20 || 
|- style="background:#fcf;"
| 32 || December 16 || Philadelphia || 1–4 || Washington  ||  || Niittymaki || 15,021 || 8–20–4 || 20 || 
|- style="background:#fcf;"
| 33 || December 19 || Carolina  || 2–1 || Philadelphia ||  || Niittymaki || 19,111 || 8–21–4 || 20 || 
|- style="background:#fcf;"
| 34 || December 21 || Philadelphia || 2–4 || Montreal  ||  || Niittymaki || 21,273 || 8–22–4 || 20 || 
|- style="background:#fcf;"
| 35 || December 23 || Ottawa  || 6–3 || Philadelphia ||  || Niittymaki || 19,268 || 8–23–4 || 20 || 
|- style="background:#fcf;"
| 36 || December 27 || Philadelphia || 1–3 || Florida ||  || Niittymaki || 17,771 || 8–24–4 || 20 || 
|- style="background:#cfc;"
| 37 || December 28 || Philadelphia || 4–3 || Tampa Bay  ||  || Esche || 21,171 || 9–24–4 || 22 || 
|- style="background:#cfc;"
| 38 || December 31 || Philadelphia || 5–2 || Carolina  ||  || Esche || 18,796 || 10–24–4 || 24 || 
|-

|- style="background:#cfc;"
| 39 || January 2 || Philadelphia || 3–2 || NY Islanders  ||  || Esche || 10,461 || 11–24–4 || 26 || 
|- style="background:#fcf;"
| 40 || January 4 || Philadelphia || 2–3 || NY Rangers  ||  || Esche || 18,200 || 11–25–4 || 26 || 
|- style="background:#fcf;"
| 41 || January 6 || Philadelphia || 3–4 || Boston  ||  || Esche || 17,565 || 11–26–4 || 26 || 
|- style="background:#fcf;"
| 42 || January 7 || Philadelphia || 1–6 || Ottawa  ||  || Niittymaki || 18,509 || 11–27–4 || 26 || 
|- style="background:#fcf;"
| 43 || January 9 || Philadelphia || 2–6 || Washington  ||  || Esche || 13,143 || 11–28–4 || 26 || 
|- style="background:#fcf;"
| 44 || January 11 || Montreal  || 4–2 || Philadelphia ||  || Niittymaki || 19,411 || 11–29–4 || 26 || 
|- style="background:#fcf;"
| 45 || January 13 || Pittsburgh  || 5–3 || Philadelphia ||  || Niittymaki || 19,587 || 11–30–4 || 26 || 
|- style="background:#fcf;"
| 46 || January 18 || NY Islanders  || 4–2 || Philadelphia ||  || Niittymaki || 19,118 || 11–31–4 || 26 || 
|- style="background:#ffc;"
| 47 || January 20 || Philadelphia || 3–4 || New Jersey  || SO || Niittymaki || 16,621 || 11–31–5 || 27 || 
|- style="background:#fcf;"
| 48 || January 27 || NY Rangers  || 2–1 || Philadelphia ||  || Esche || 19,618 || 11–32–5 || 27 || 
|- style="background:#cfc;"
| 49 || January 28 || Philadelphia || 2–1 || Atlanta  ||  || Niittymaki || 18,598 || 12–32–5 || 29 || 
|- style="background:#ffc;"
| 50 || January 30 || Tampa Bay  || 4–3 || Philadelphia || SO || Esche || 19,313 || 12–32–6 || 30 || 
|-

|- style="background:#ffc;"
| 51 || February 1 || New Jersey  || 6–5 || Philadelphia || OT || Niittymaki || 19,427 || 12–32–7 || 31 || 
|- style="background:#cfc;"
| 52 || February 3 || Philadelphia || 5–2 || Atlanta  ||  || Niittymaki || 18,622 || 13–32–7 || 33 || 
|- style="background:#fcf;"
| 53 || February 7 || Philadelphia || 0–2 || NY Islanders  ||  || Niittymaki || 10,229 || 13–33–7 || 33 || 
|- style="background:#ffc;"
| 54 || February 8 || Pittsburgh  || 5–4 || Philadelphia || SO || Niittymaki || 19,512 || 13–33–8 || 34 || 
|- style="background:#cfc;"
| 55 || February 10 || St. Louis  || 3–4 || Philadelphia || OT || Leighton || 19,215 || 14–33–8 || 36 || 
|- style="background:#cfc;"
| 56 || February 12 || Detroit  || 1–6 || Philadelphia ||  || Leighton || 19,575 || 15–33–8 || 38 || 
|- style="background:#fcf;"
| 57 || February 15 || Toronto  || 4–2 || Philadelphia ||  || Leighton || 19,321 || 15–34–8 || 38 || 
|- style="background:#cfc;"
| 58 || February 17 || Philadelphia || 5–3 || NY Rangers  ||  || Niittymaki || 18,200 || 16–34–8 || 40 || 
|- style="background:#fcf;"
| 59 || February 19 || Boston  || 6–3 || Philadelphia ||  || Niittymaki || 19,209 || 16–35–8 || 40 || 
|- style="background:#fcf;"
| 60 || February 20 || Philadelphia || 3–6 || Buffalo  ||  || Esche || 18,690 || 16–36–8 || 40 || 
|- style="background:#ffc;"
| 61 || February 22 || Philadelphia || 2–3 || Carolina  || OT || Niittymaki || 14,533 || 16–36–9 || 41 || 
|- style="background:#fcf;"
| 62 || February 24 || Toronto  || 5–2 || Philadelphia ||  || Leighton || 19,277 || 16–37–9 || 41 || 
|- style="background:#ffc;"
| 63 || February 27 || Philadelphia  || 5–6 || NY Islanders || OT  || Niittymaki || 11,443 || 16–37–10 || 42 || 
|-

|- style="background:#cfc;"
| 64 || March 1 || Philadelphia  || 4–3 || Boston || OT  || Biron || 12,294 || 17–37–10 || 44 || 
|- style="background:#ffc;"
| 65 || March 4 || Philadelphia  || 3–4 || Pittsburgh || SO  || Biron || 17,132|| 17–37–11 || 45 || 
|- style="background:#cfc;"
| 66 || March 6 || New Jersey  || 4–5 || Philadelphia || OT  || Biron || 19,210|| 18–37–11 || 47 || 
|- style="background:#fcf;"
| 67 || March 8 || Florida  || 2–1 || Philadelphia ||  || Biron || 19,489|| 18–38–11 || 47 || 
|- style="background:#cfc;"
| 68 || March 10 || Boston  || 4–1 || Philadelphia ||  || Biron || 19,550|| 19–38–11 || 49 || 
|- style="background:#fcf;"
| 69 || March 12 || Philadelphia  || 0–4 || Phoenix ||  || Biron || 14,799|| 19–39–11 || 49 || 
|- style="background:#fcf;"
| 70 || March 13 || Philadelphia  || 2–3 || Dallas ||  || Niittymaki || 17,618|| 19–40–11 || 49 || 
|- style="background:#cfc;"
| 71 || March 15 || Atlanta  || 2–3 || Philadelphia ||  || Biron || 19,122|| 20–40–11 || 51 || 
|- style="background:#fcf;"
| 72 || March 17 || Philadelphia  || 2–3 || Ottawa ||  || Biron || 19,639|| 20–41–11 || 51 || 
|- style="background:#fcf;"
| 73 || March 20 || Florida  || 4–1 || Philadelphia ||  || Biron || 18,721|| 20–42–11 || 51 || 
|- style="background:#fcf;"
| 74 || March 21 || Philadelphia  || 0–5 || NY Rangers ||  || Niittymaki || 18,200|| 20–43–11 || 51 || 
|- style="background:#fcf;"
| 75 || March 24 || NY Islanders  || 4–3 || Philadelphia ||  || Biron || 19,422|| 20–44–11 || 51 || 
|- style="background:#cfc;"
| 76 || March 28 || Carolina  || 1–5 || Philadelphia ||  || Biron || 19,123|| 21–44–11 || 53 || 
|- style="background:#fcf;"
| 77 || March 30 || Philadelphia  || 1–3 || New Jersey ||  || Biron || 17,493|| 21–45–11 || 53 || 
|- style="background:#fcf;"
| 78 || March 31 || NY Rangers  || 6–4 || Philadelphia ||  || Biron || 19,555|| 21–46–11 || 53 || 
|-

|- style="background:#ffc;"
| 79 || April 3 || Philadelphia  || 2–3 || Toronto || OT || Biron || 19,547|| 21–46–12 || 54 || 
|- style="background:#fcf;"
| 80 || April 5 || New Jersey  || 3–2 || Philadelphia ||  || Biron || 19,177|| 21–47–12 || 54 || 
|- style="background:#fcf;"
| 81 || April 7 || NY Islanders  || 4–2 || Philadelphia ||  || Niittymaki || 19,412|| 21–48–12 || 54 || 
|- style="background:#cfc;"
| 82 || April 8 || Buffalo  || 3–4 || Philadelphia ||  || Biron || 19,550|| 22–48–12 || 56 || 
|-

|-
| Legend:

Player statistics

Scoring
 Position abbreviations: C = Center; D = Defense; G = Goaltender; LW = Left Wing; RW = Right Wing
  = Joined team via a transaction (e.g., trade, waivers, signing) during the season. Stats reflect time with the Flyers only.
  = Left team via a transaction (e.g., trade, waivers, release) during the season. Stats reflect time with the Flyers only.

Goaltending
  = Joined team via a transaction (e.g., trade, waivers, signing) during the season. Stats reflect time with the Flyers only.
  = Left team via a transaction (e.g., trade, waivers, release) during the season. Stats reflect time with the Flyers only.

Awards and records

Awards

Records

Among the team records set during the 2006–07 season was a number of losing and winless streaks, including a nine-game losing streak (December 8 to December 27), an eight-game home losing streak (December 9 to January 27), and a 13-game home winless streak (November 29 to February 8). Goaltender Antero Niittymaki went a team record 15 games winless from December 2 to January 20. A lone bright spot was Alexandre Picard’s five assists on February 1 against the New Jersey Devils, setting team records for most assists in a single game by a defenseman and by a rookie.

Franchise single season records were set for most losses (48), most home losses (24), fewest home wins (10), fewest points (56), lowest points percentage (.341), and fewest shootout wins (1, tied during the 2021–22 season). Niittymaki’s 29 losses tied Bernie Parent’s 1969–70 record for most losses in a single season by a Flyers goaltender.

Milestones

Transactions
The Flyers were involved in the following transactions from June 20, 2006, the day after the deciding game of the 2006 Stanley Cup Finals, through June 6, 2007, the day of the deciding game of the 2007 Stanley Cup Finals.

Trades

Players acquired

Players lost

Signings

Draft picks

Philadelphia's picks at the 2006 NHL Entry Draft, which was held at General Motors Place in Vancouver on June 24, 2006. The Flyers original third-round pick, 85th overall, was traded to the San Jose Sharks for Niko Dimitrakos on March 9, 2006.

Farm teams
The Flyers were affiliated with the Philadelphia Phantoms of the AHL and the Trenton Titans of the ECHL. After an early season coaching change from Craig Berube, who joined the Flyers as an assistant, to Kjell Samuelsson, the Phantoms struggled finishing sixth in their division and missing the playoffs. Trenton finished 4th in their division and made it to the 2nd round of the playoffs before losing to the Dayton Bombers in their last season as a Flyers affiliate. Following the 2006–07 ECHL season the Titans were renamed the Trenton Devils by their new owners, the New Jersey Devils.

Notes

References
General
 
 
 
Specific

Phil
Phil
Philadelphia Flyers seasons
Philadelphia
Philadelphia